The Empire State League was a minor league baseball league that played from 1905 to 1907. The 14 different league franchises were based exclusively in New York (state). The league name was succeeded by the 1913 Empire State League based in Georgia and Empire State League (1987) based in New York (state).

History
On March 22, 1905, the Empire State League was formed at a meeting held in Syracuse, New York. The teams were selected and R.C. Mayor of Rome was elected secretary and treasurer. Salaries were set at $600.00 per month for each team.

The 1905 Empire State League began play as an eight–team independent league on May 26, 1905. Seneca Falls won the championship with a 42–26 record and several teams folded or relocated during the 1905 season.

In 1906, the Empire State League reduced to six teams, beginning the season on May 26, 1906 and becoming a Class D level minor league. With a record of 48–26, Seneca Falls again won the championship.

In its final season of play, the 1907 Empire State League continued play as a six–team Class D level league and crowned a new champion. The Oswego Starchmakers finished 1.0 game ahead of 2nd place Seneca Falls to win the league championship.

M.T. Roche served as president of the Empire State League for all three seasons of play.

Cities Represented 
Auburn, NY: Auburn 1906–1907 
Canandaigua, NY: Canandaigua 1905 
Cortland, NY: Cortland 1905 
Fulton, NY: Fulton 1905–1907 
Geneva, NY: Geneva 1905–1907 
Ilion, NY: Ilion 1905 
Lyons, NY: Lyons 1905, 1907 
Oneida, NY: Oneida 1905 
Oswego, NY: Oswego Starchmakers 1905–1907 
Palmyra, NY: Palmyra 1905 
Penn Yan, NY: Penn Yan 1906 
Rome, NY: Rome 1905 
Seneca Falls, NY: Seneca Falls 1905–1907 
Syracuse, NY: Syracuse 1906

Standings & statistics
1905 Empire State League
 Palmyra moved to Geneva in June; Ilion moved to Fulton July 10; Cortland disbanded July 18 (record unknown); Oneida disbanded July 25; Canandaigua disbanded July 27. 

1906 Empire State Leagueschedule
Penn Yan (20–40) moved to Syracuse August 23; Syracuse folded before playing a game.

1907 Empire State Leagueschedule

References

Baseball leagues in New York (state)
Sports leagues established in 1905
Sports leagues disestablished in 1907
Defunct minor baseball leagues in the United States